Edward Nelson is an American former Negro league outfielder who played in the 1940s.

Nelson played for the Cincinnati Clowns in 1943. In 12 recorded games, he posted six hits in 39 plate appearances.

References

External links
 and Seamheads

Year of birth missing
Place of birth missing
Cincinnati Clowns players
Baseball outfielders